Giovanni Giacomo Imperiale Tartaro (Genoa, 1554 - Genoa, 1622) was the 92nd Doge of the Republic of Genoa.

Biography 
On April 25, 1617 Imperiale Tartaro was elected doge of Genoa, the forty-seventh in the biennial succession and the ninety-second in republican history. During his Dogate he pacified relations with the Genoese archiepiscopal curia, in particular with Monsignor Domenico de 'Marini, and prepared new defensive works in the territory of Genoa and the republic. After his mandate ended on April 29, 1619 Imperiale Tartaro returned to his home in Piazza del Campetto, where he died in 1622.

See also 

 Republic of Genoa
 Doge of Genoa
 Imperiali family

References 

17th-century Doges of Genoa
1554 births
1622 deaths